The Rwanda Film Festival, also known as Hillywood, is a film festival held annually in July in Kigali, Rwanda. The Rwanda Film Festival gained worldwide recognition over the past years and has become one of Africa's major film events.

History
The Rwanda Film Festival was founded in 2005 by Eric Kabera. Presented by the Rwanda Cinema Center, an organization that aims to promote the country's film industry, the Rwanda Film Festival, nicknamed "Hillywood" due to Rwanda's nickname of "Land of a Thousand Hills", is a travelling festival. Due to Kabera's desire to show the films to as large of an audience as possible, the festival is held not only in the capital of Kigali, but the films, especially ones made by Rwandan film-makers, are also shown on large inflatable screens in rural areas throughout the country. More recently, Kabera has stated that the festival will make a move away from focusing only on the issue of the genocide; rather "other social issues" of modern Rwanda will be explored.

Silverback Awards
The Silverback Awards were launched after the Silverback Sponsorship from London firm Hard Media with the Rwanda Film Festival.
Hillywood Award
East Africa Award
Best Documentary Film
Best Feature Film
Best Short Film
Best Director
Resilience Award
Rwanda as Seen Around the World
Audience Award
Out of Africa: Films on Africa

See also
Urusaro International Women Film Festival
List of films about the Rwandan genocide

References

External links

Further reading

Film festivals in Rwanda
Film festivals established in 2005
July events
African film festivals